The Codex Xolotl (also known as Codicé Xolotl) is a postconquest cartographic Aztec codex, thought to have originated before 1542. It is annotated in Nahuatl and details the preconquest history of the Valley of Mexico, and Texcoco in particular, from the arrival of the Chichimeca under the king Xolotl in the year 5 Flint (1224) to the Tepanec War in 1427.

The codex describes Xolotl's and the Chichimeca's entry to the then unpopulated valley as peaceful. Although this picture is confirmed by the Texcocan historian Fernando de Alva Cortés Ixtlilxochitl (1568 or 1580–1648), there is other evidence that suggests that the area was inhabited by the Toltecs.

Ixtlilxochitl, a direct descendant of Ixtlilxochitl I and Ixtlilxochitl II, based much of his writings on the documents which he most probably obtained from relatives in Texcoco or Teotihuacan. The codex was first brought to Europe in 1840 by the French scientist , and is currently held by the Bibliothèque nationale de France in Paris.

While it is unknown who did the binding of the manuscript, it is cast like a European book back to back. The Codex Xolotl has been an important source in giving detailed information on material, social, political and cultural changes in the region during the period. It is one of the few still surviving cartographic histories from the Valley of Mexico and one of the earliest of its type.

Historical Significance 
The Codex Xolotl is an example of material culture. This means that the codex can be used as an object to understand the culture of the Aztecs. The object itself shows the Aztec understanding of the history of Texcoco. It is also a document that includes an early instance of Nahuatl writings referencing specific dates. There is some ongoing debate regarding how many writers were involved in creating the codex itself. This can propose discrepancy about how much personal influence was involved in creating the document.

Controversy 
There are some debates that question how valid the codex is from an archaeological perspective. This debate roots itself in the work of Jeffrey Parsons in 1970s, with his book detailing the archaeology of the Texcoco region. One side of this debate states that the codex itself is not supported by the archaeological evidence of the region.

Another argument claims that within the discrepancies, some historical facts can be separated from the mythology. An alternate response to Parsons' argument uses a hypothesis regarding a conflict between the Tula and Cholula regions to support Parsons' position.

See also
Aztec codices

Notes

External links
 High Definition scans of the codex at the French National Library

References

 
Codices
Manuscripts by area
A
16th century in the Aztec civilization
16th century in Mexico
16th century in New Spain
Pictograms
Xolotl
1540s books
16th-century illuminated manuscripts
Aztec society
Nahuatl literature
Texcoco (altepetl)
1540s in Mexico
1540s in New Spain
Bibliothèque nationale de France collections
1540s in North America